Irénée du Pont I (December 21, 1876 – December 19, 1963) was an American businessman, president of the DuPont company and head of the Du Pont trust.

Early life
Irénée du Pont I was born on December 21, 1876, in New Castle, Delaware, the son of Mary Belin and Lammot du Pont I, and a descendant of DuPont founder Éleuthère Irénée du Pont. When he was eight years old, his father was killed in an explosion at the DuPont works in Repauno, New Jersey.

He graduated from the William Penn Charter School in 1892 before attending Phillips Academy for a year, graduating in 1894, and the Massachusetts Institute of Technology in 1897. He received his Master's degree in Chemical Engineering from MIT a year after graduation. While at MIT, he was a member of the Phi Beta Epsilon fraternity.

Career 
He worked for Fenn's Manufacturing Contracting Company for a number of years before he joined DuPont in 1903. du Pont first worked in the organization of a construction division in black powder, then worked as assistant treasurer, assistant to the general manager and manager of the developmental department. By the start of World War I he was the vice president, and he was named the chairman of the executive committee a year later.

He was the elected president of DuPont from 1919 to 1925, where he oversaw the dismantling of the companies war productions from WWI. At the time of his death he was credited with being responsible for the shift of the company from being solely dependent on explosives' to being a more diverse industrial company. He oversaw DuPont at a time when eight workers were fatally poisoned with tetraethyl lead while he issued statements about there being "slight difficulties".

He retired from the board of directors of DuPont in 1958 and was succeeded by his son Irénée du Pont Jr.

Personal life 
du Pont married a second cousin of his, Irene Sophie du Pont, and had nine children with her: eight daughters and a son.

He built a mansion in Varadero, Cuba, which he named Xanadu. In 1957, Fortune estimated his wealth at between $200 million and $400 million, making him one of the two richest members of the Du Pont family at that time, and one of the twenty richest Americans (see Wealthiest Americans (1957)).

du Pont was a registered Republican, voted to repeal Prohibition and was a opponent of the New Deal Administration of President Franklin Roosevelt. In the 1930s, he was a proponent of eugenics and racial superiority theories and supported right-wing political groups; du Pont was also a noted supporter of Adolf Hitler and had followed the eventual führer since the 1920s. However, he was not the President of DuPont during the company's conglomeration with German companies and involvement in rearmament there after the rise of Nazism and well into World War II.

He died on December 19, 1963, in Wilmington, Delaware.

References

External links
 The Sophie du Pont May papers at Hagley Museum and Library contain a series of correspondence between Irénée du Pont and his older sister, Louisa d'Andelot du Pont Copeland. Sophie du Pont May was Irénée du Pont's daughter.

American businesspeople
American eugenicists
American people of French descent
1876 births
1963 deaths
Irenee
Massachusetts Institute of Technology alumni
Old Right (United States)
People from New Castle, Delaware